North Carolina's 79th House district is one of 120 districts in the North Carolina House of Representatives. It has been represented by Republican Keith Kidwell since 2019.

Geography
Since 2023, the district has included all of Beaufort, Pamlico, and Hyde counties, as well as most of Dare County. The district overlaps with the 1st and 2nd Senate districts.

District officeholders

Election results

2022

2020

2018

2016

2014

2012

2010

2008

2006

2004

2002

2000

References

North Carolina House districts
Beaufort County, North Carolina
Pamlico County, North Carolina
Hyde County, North Carolina
Dare County, North Carolina